Malinovoye Ozero is an urban locality (urban-type settlement) in Mikhaylovsky District of Altai Krai, Russia. Population:

References

Notes

Sources

Urban-type settlements in Altai Krai